MK or mk may refer to:

In arts, entertainment and media

Fictional characters 
 Moon Knight, a Marvel Comics superhero
 M.K., an Into the Badlands (TV series) character
 Mary Katherine "M.K." Bomba, the protagonist in Epic (2013 film)

Video games
 Makai Kingdom: Chronicles of the Sacred Tome, a tactical role-playing game
 Mario Kart, a series of racing video games developed and published by Nintendo featuring characters from the Mario franchise
 Mortal Kombat'', a series of fighting video games developed and published by Midway Games, and later Warner Bros

Other media
 MK (channel), a defunct, South African, Afrikaans-language music television channel
 Moskovskij Komsomolets, a Russian newspaper

In business and finance
 Markup (business), a term for the difference between the cost of a good or service and its selling price
 Mark (designation), a designation used to identify versions of a product or item, e.g. Mk. II
 Finnish markka  (symbol: Mk), defunct currency of Finland

Businesses and organizations
 MK Airlines, a British cargo airline
 MK Electric, an English manufacturer of electrical goods
 MK Group, a Serbian holding company
 Air Mauritius, a Mauritian passenger airline (IATA designation: MK)
 Michael Kors (brand),  American fashion brand
 Mysore Kirloskar, an Indian manufacturer of lathes, part of the Kirloskar Group
 Montreal Kosher, known as MK, a Canadian kosher certification agency
 Morrison-Knudsen, an engineering and construction firm

Languages
 Macedonian language (ISO 639 digram "mk")
 Middle Korean (10th–16th centuries)

People
 MK Nobilette, also Emkay, (born 1994), American singer
 M. K. Asante (born 1982), American author, filmmaker and professor
 Marc Kinchen (MK), American house-music producer 
 Mark Knopfler (born 1949), English musician, co-founder of Dire Straits
 Michael Kors (born 1959), American fashion designer

Places
 MK postcode area, UK postal districts in the greater Milton Keynes and Bedford areas
 North Macedonia (ISO country code MK)
 .mk, the Internet country code top-level domain for North Macedonia
 Magic Kingdom, a Walt Disney World theme park in Greater Orlando
 Mong Kok, an area of Hong Kong
 Milton Keynes, a city in southern England
 Magic Kingdom, Sydney, a defunct theme park in Australia

In politics
 Member of Knesset, the legislature of Israel
 Umkhonto we Sizwe (Spear of the Nation), an armed wing of the African National Congress (the majority party in South Africa)
 Mebyon Kernow, a Cornish political party in the United Kingdom

In religion
 Gospel of Mark, the second book of the New Testament in the Christian Bible
 Missionary Kids, the children of missionary parents
 Mk, a post-nominal title for a monk

In science, technology, and mathematics
 Mark (designation), a designation used to identify versions of a product or item, e.g. Mk. II
 mk (software), a make replacement in the Plan 9 from Bell Labs and Inferno operating systems
 Mk reference point, an interface of the IP Multimedia Subsystem used to exchange messages between BGCFs in different networks
 Morgan-Keenan (MK) spectral classification, a stellar classification system based on spectral lines
 Megakelvin (MK), an SI unit of temperature
 Midkine, a protein
 Millikelvin (mK), an SI unit of temperature
 Morse–Kelley set theory in the field of mathematics

In sport
 FK Mandalskameratene, a Norwegian football club
 Milton Keynes Dons F.C., a football team in Milton Keynes often shortened to MK Dons

Other uses
 Machinery Technician, an enlisted rating in the United States Coast Guard
 Chrysler MK platform (Jeep Compass and Jeep Patriot)
 Medical kit, a first aid kit

See also

MKULTRA (disambiguation)